Kampong Belimbing is a village in Brunei-Muara District, Brunei. It is also a neighbourhood in the capital Bandar Seri Begawan. The population was 2,721 in 2016. It is one of the villages within Mukim Kota Batu. The postcode is BD2917.

References 

Villages in Brunei-Muara District
Neighbourhoods in Bandar Seri Begawan